Pralhad Venkatesh Joshi (born 27 November 1962) is an Indian politician who is the current union Minister of Parliamentary Affairs, Coal and Mines of India,  since 30 May 2019 and Member of Parliament in the Lok Sabha, since 2004, representing the Dharwad Lok Sabha constituency. He was also the State President of Bharatiya Janata Party, Karnataka (BJP) from 2014 to 2016. He served in the panel of chairpersons of Lok Sabha (2014-2018).

Pralhad Joshi (sometimes spelled Prahlad Joshi) first came to public notice with RSS when they organised a movement to hoist the Tri-colour flag at Idagah Maidan Hubli Karnataka during 1992–1994. Recently the Supreme court has upheld the Karnataka High Court order restoring the ownership of the said maidan to The Hubli-Dharwad Municipal corporation. He has been elected to Lok Sabha in the general elections of 2004, 2009, 2014, and 2019.

On 30 May 2019, Pralhad Joshi was sworn in as a cabinet minister in Prime Minister Narendra Modi's second term government.

Early politics 
An industrialist by vocation in his early days, Pralhad Joshi ingratiated himself into the political fray by organizing a movement to hoist the Tri-colour flag at Idagah Maidan (also known as Kittur Rani chennamma Maidan) Hubli Karnataka from 1992 to 1994. He also led the "Save Kashmir Movement" during those years, which established him as a known figure in those regions of the state. He was then elected the president of BJP in Dharwad district. He first contested in the 14th Lok Sabha elections in 2004 where he won the Dharwad constituency by defeating INC's B.S Patil.

He's won three consecutive elections from that constituency and is the incumbent MP of Dharwad. In the 2009 General elections, he won by second highest margin amidst 28 constituencies in Karnataka, while most of the ministers and MPs secured a loss in the same year. In 2019, he retained the Dharwad seat for a second term by a margin of over one lakh votes and was subsequently appointed Minister of parliamentary affairs; Minister of coal; and Minister of Mines in Modi's cabinet.

Union Minister
He took oath as the Cabinet minister on 30 May 2019 and became the Minister of Parliamentary Affairs, Coal and Mines.

References

|-

|-

|-

|-

|-

External links
 Members of Fourteenth Lok Sabha - Parliament of India website

Living people
1962 births
Bharatiya Janata Party politicians from Karnataka
India MPs 2004–2009
India MPs 2009–2014
People from Hubli
Lok Sabha members from Karnataka
India MPs 2014–2019
People from Bijapur, Karnataka
India MPs 2019–present
Narendra Modi ministry
Madhva Brahmins